Elizabeth "Budd" Bell was a human service lobbyist, and social worker by education, who was one of the people that helped draft Florida's Baker Act.  She was known as “the conscience of Florida.”

She was inducted into the Florida Women's Hall of Fame in 2012.

Biography
Born Elizabeth ”Bess” Lander in 1915, Bell died October 15, 2009, at the age of 94.  She was a Winnipeg native who emigrated to the United States in 949.

Career
Bell founded the Budd Bell Clearinghouse of Human Services in 1974, the Florida Center for Children and Youth and Florida's Human Rights Advocacy Committee. Bell was a founding member of the National Association of Social Workers.

References

1915 births
American women activists
2009 deaths
American social workers
Florida Women's Hall of Fame Inductees